Everybody Dies by the End is a 2022 comedy horror found footage mockumentary film written by Ian Tripp and directed by Tripp and Ryan Schafer in their feature film debut. The film stars Vinny Curran, Bill Oberst Jr., Brendan Cahalan, Iliyana Apostolova, and Ian Tripp.

Plot 
A crew follows a cult film director, making a documentary as he makes his last film.

Cast 
 Vinny Curran
 Bill Oberst Jr.
 Brendan Cahalan
 Iliyana Apostolova
 Ian Tripp
 Ryan Schafer
 Caroline Amiguet

Production
The film is Tripp and Schafer's feature film debut. Principal photography took place in San Diego.

Release 
The film premiered August 29, 2022 at FrightFest.

Reception 
Jim Morazzini at Voices From The Balcony gave it 3 out of 5 and said it is “worth seeing.” Kat Hughes at The Hollywood News scored it 3 out of 5 claiming it is a “hard-earned win” for Tripp and Schafer. Martin Unsworth at Starburst Magazine called it "watchable" scoring it 3 out of 5. Film critic Anton Bitel at Projected Figures said it is a found footage satire. Entertainment Focus scored it 2 out of 5 stating the screenplay had good ideas that were not realised.

References

External links 
 
 

American comedy horror films
2022 comedy horror films
Found footage films
American satirical films
2020s satirical films
2020s mockumentary films
Docuhorror films
Films about screenwriters
Films about film directors and producers
Self-reflexive films
Films shot in San Diego
Films set in San Diego
2022 independent films
2020s English-language films
2022 directorial debut films